The 1998 San Francisco 49ers season was the franchise's 49th season in the National Football League and their 53rd overall. The Niners were heavily favored to represent the NFC in Super Bowl XXXIII for the second time in the 1990s. 

The season saw the return of Jerry Rice, who missed most of 1997 with a major knee injury.

After defeating the Green Bay Packers in the wild-card round of the playoffs, thanks to young Terrell Owens's game-winning catch, referred to by fans as "The Catch II", San Francisco's season ended with a loss to the Atlanta Falcons the following week in the divisional round. The Falcons went on to defeat the 15–1 Minnesota Vikings in the NFC title game but lost to the Denver Broncos in the Super Bowl.

The divisional-round game was Steve Young's final playoff appearance, as he suffered a concussion in Week 3 of the following season, which ultimately ended his 15-year NFL career. Also in the divisional-round game, 49ers running back Garrison Hearst broke his foot, keeping him out of football for the next two seasons. Hearst was the first NFL player to be on the cover of Madden NFL, and his injury marked the beginning of the Madden curse.

Offseason

NFL Draft

Personnel

Staff

Roster

Regular season

Schedule

Game summaries

Week 1 vs. Jets

The game lead tied or changed eight times in regulation as the Jets under Bill Parcells came to Candlestick Park.  Jets quarterback Glenn Foley matched Steve Young's three touchdowns and one pick with three scores and one pick of his own; Foley put up 415 yards to Young's 363 yards.  The two teams traded punts in overtime; the Niners had to start at their four-yard line and coach Steve Mariucci called "90 O", a run play intended to get away from their endzone. Garrison Hearst burst through a hole and raced 96 yards straddling the sideline, getting key blocks from Dave Fiore despite an injured leg, and from Terrell Owens for the touchdown and a 36–30 Niners win.

Week 2: at Washington Redskins 
The Niners defeated the Redskins 45–10 with 504 yards of offense and three touchdowns by Steve Young. The Redskins coughed up the ball three times in the loss.

Week 3: Bye
Bye week

Week 4: vs. Atlanta Falcons
Hosting the 2–1 Falcons, the Niners picked off Chris Chandler three times and won 31–20 behind 387 passing yards, 50 rushing yards, and three touchdowns from Steve Young.
|Weather=  (Light Rain)

Week 5: at Buffalo Bills
The Niners traveled to Rich Stadium to face the Bills and crashed hard 26–21 despite 21 fourth-quarter points. The Niners committed 22 penalties eating up 178 yards (compared to Buffalo's 12 fouls for 106), while the two teams' punters Chris Mohr and Reggie Roby combined for 323 punting yards.

Week 6: at New Orleans Saints
Still smarting from their poor performance at Buffalo, the Niners traveled to the Superdome and crushed Mike Ditka's Saints 31–0.  The game was another penalty-laden affair with a combined 24 fouls eating up 240 yards.  The Niners shut down Danny Wuerffel and Billy Joe Tolliver, limiting them to 15 completions for 174 yards and a pick.

Week 7: vs Indianapolis Colts
The Niners hosted the Colts and their new quarterback Peyton Manning. The Colts immediately served notice for the future as they raced to a 21–0 lead behind two Manning scores to Marvin Harrison and a 65-yard score from future Ram Marshall Faulk; Manning would add another touchdown to Harrison in the third quarter and the Colts added a field goal following a Garrison Hearst fumble and subsequent personal foul penalty.  The Niners clawed back as Steve Young threw three touchdowns and ran in a fourth; a botched PAT by Ty Detmer and resultant smothered two-point attempt led on the Niners' next possession to a Jerry Rice two-point conversion catch from Young to tie the game.  Mike Vanderjagt missed from 53 yards out on the Colts' next possession with 1:10 to go, then after a crushing pass interference penalty on Tyrone Poole against J.J. Stokes with 43 seconds to go (this following two Young interceptions erased on Indianapolis holding penalties in the first half) Wade Richey's 24-yard field goal won it 34–31 for the Niners.  The game became notable in league history for the showdown between veteran Young (331 passing yards, 60 rushing yards nearly matching Garrison Hearst at 65, and four total touchdowns) and rookie phenomenon Manning (231 passing yards and three scores); the game featured eight Hall of Famers in Young, Manning, Jerry Rice, Marvin Harrison, Bryant Young, Marshall Faulk, Terrell Owens, and Chris Doleman.
|Weather= (Sunny)

Week 8: at St. Louis Rams
Hitting the TWA Dome, the Niners cruised to a 28–10 win over the Rams as Steve Young overcame two picks with three touchdowns and budding superstar Terrell Owens ran in a 21-yard score. The Niners picked off Tony Banks three times.

Week 9: at Green Bay Packers
For the fifth straight time the Niners fell to the Green Bay Packers, this time 36–22 at Lambeau Field. The Niners overcame a botched punt snap for safety and erased a 16–0 Packer lead to take the lead 22–19 in the third quarter. From there, despite three Brett Favre interceptions, it all fell apart for the Niners as the Packers unleashed 17 unanswered points.

Week 10: vs. Carolina Panthers
Ty Detmer took over for Steve Young against the 1–7 Panthers, throwing for 276 yards and three touchdowns (to J.J. Stokes and Terrell Owens), but three interceptions kept the Panthers in the game and they took a 23–22 lead before Wade Richey's 46-yard field goal capped a 25–23 Niners win.
|Weather= (Cloudy)

Week 11: at Atlanta Falcons
The battle for the NFC West had now become a true battle as the 7–2 Falcons hosted the 7–2 Niners and things got ugly for San Francisco.  Steve Young managed 342 passing yards but only 21 completions; the Falcons grabbed a fumble at the Niners goalline for a Jessie Tuggle touchdown and when Young connected on long-range scores to Terrell Owens and Jerry Rice, Chris Chandler put the game away on his 78-yard strike to Terance Mathis.  The 31–19 Falcons win marked the end of the Niners' hold on the division crown that season.

Week 12: vs. New Orleans Saints
Steve Young outdueled ex-Panther Kerry Collins despite a Collins rushing score that put the 5–6 Saints up 10–0 in the first quarter.  The Niners outscored the Saints 31–10 in the second and third quarters on four Young touchdown throws.  Collins was picked twice and failed on fourth and goal at the Niners' 1-yard line in the fourth quarter; an Aaron Craver rushing score in the final two minutes put the Saints within eleven points at the end.

Week 13: vs. New York Giants
A Gary Brown rushing score in the opening six minutes of the first quarter was the only time the Giants were in contention as Steve Young answered with a 79-yard touchdown to Terrell Owens.  Young scored again at the end of the second quarter and Terry Kirby and Garrison Hearst ran in the ball for additional scores and 31–7 Niners win.

Week 16: at New England Patriots
Following four straight wins the Niners traveled to Foxboro Stadium to face a struggling Patriots squad.  Regular starter Drew Bledsoe was out for the year with a broken throwing hand so backup Scott Zolak took over.  Despite a blocked field goal attempt the Niners scored 21 second-quarter points (including a touchdown from backup Ty Detmer on a fake field goal attempt), but the Patriots battled back and tied the game on a Robert Edwards four-yard score, then won it on a drive in the final 1:48 on four straight Edwards rushes and then on Adam Vinatieri's 35-yard field goal with eighteen seconds left.  Terrell Owens was held to three catches for 61 yards; in the second quarter the two teams exchanged interceptions as a pass for Owens was intercepted by Ty Law but three plays later a Zolak pass to Ben Coates was intercepted by Tim McDonald.

Week 17 vs. St. Louis Rams
Former Niner Steve Bono put the Rams, winless against the Niners since 1990, up 7–0 on a touchdown to Ricky Proehl.  Proehl would catch another touchdown but by then the game was out of reach on two Steve Young touchdowns and scores from R. W. McQuarters and three Wade Richey field goals. Notably, this was the first game in which former Arena Football quarterback, Kurt Warner, saw playing time in the NFL, completing four of eleven passes for 39 yards.

Standings

Playoffs

Postseason

NFC Wild Card vs Green Bay Packers

For the first time in the Brett Favre era, the 49ers pulled off a victory over the Packers. After a late Packers touchdown, the Niners trailed 27–23 and a continuing issue during the game was dropped passes by the receiver Terrell Owens. In the final ten seconds, Steve Young dropped back in the Packers' RedZone, stumbled but stayed on his feet, then heaved the ball to the endzone where Owens caught it and landed in the endzone with four seconds left, holding on to the ball despite hits by two Packers defensive backs. The Niners had pulled out one of the most dramatic wins in their history. This play is often referred to by 49ers fans as "the Catch II", a reference to "The Catch" touchdown from Joe Montana to Dwight Clark in the final minute against the Cowboys in the 1981 playoffs.  The victory over the Packers turned out to be Young's final playoff win.

NFC Divisional Playoff at Atlanta Falcons

The game started poorly for the 13–4 49ers, who lost 1,500-yard rusher Garrison Hearst to a broken bone in his left leg on the first play of the game.  Backup Terry Kirby was only able to rush for 46 yards.  With their running game hobbled, the 49ers trailed 14–0 in the first half, and 20–10 going into the fourth quarter.  With 2:57 remaining, Young scored on an 8-yard run and the team converted a two-point conversion after a botched snap, to bring the score to 20–18.  The 49ers had one more chance to win with the ball deep in their territory but Young threw a desperation pass that was picked off by the Falcons' William White.

Awards and records
Franchise Record, Most Rushing Yards in One Game, 328 Rushing Yards (vs. Detroit Lions on December 14, 1998) 
 Led NFL, Total Yards, 6,800 Total Yards 
Garrison Hearst, Franchise Record, Most Rushing Yards in One Season, 1,570 Rushing Yards
Steve Young, Franchise Record, Most Touchdown Passes in One Season, 36 Touchdown Passes
Steve Young, Led NFL, Touchdown Passes, 36 Passes

References

External links
 1998 49ers on Pro Football Reference
 49ers Schedule on jt-sw.com

San Francisco 49ers
San Francisco 49ers seasons
1998 in San Francisco
San